Nko is a village in Yakurr Local Government of Cross River State, Nigeria. It is the shortened form of Nkoibolokom. It is one of the five Lokàà-speaking settlements that together with Agoi-Ibami, Agoi-Ekpo, Inyima, Ekpeti, and Assiga make up what is known as Yakurr. The other Lokàà-speaking towns are Idomi, Ugep, Ekori, and Mkpani.

References 

Villages in Cross River State